{{DISPLAYTITLE:C23H28ClN5O3}}
The molecular formula C23H28ClN5O3 (molar mass: 457.953 g/mol) may refer to:

 Azimilide
 Triazoledione (BMS-180492)

Molecular formulas